Iñaki Bea Jauregi (born 27 June 1978) is a Spanish retired footballer who played as a central defender, currently manager of CD Numancia.

Playing career
Bea was born in Amurrio, Álava. After starting out with modest clubs in his native Basque Country, and having a stint in the Segunda División B with Ciudad de Murcia, he had his first taste of professional football at Lorca Deportiva CF in the 2005–06 season, helping the side retain their Segunda División status under Unai Emery.

Subsequently, Bea joined Real Valladolid, scoring three goals in 35 games as the Castile and León team returned to La Liga in 2007 after a three-year absence but being less used in the following years – only seven matches in the 2007–08 campaign. He made his debut in the Spanish top flight on 28 October 2007, featuring 45 minutes in the 2–2 away draw against CA Osasuna.

Bea left in July 2009, moving to the second tier with Real Murcia, being relegated in his only season and being subsequently released. Aged 32, he had his first experience abroad, signing a 1+1 contract with Austrian club FC Wacker Innsbruck. He made his Bundesliga debut on 18 July 2010, playing the entire 4–0 home win over SK Rapid Wien. His first and only goal in the competition arrived on 22 September of that year, when he helped to a 4–2 away defeat of Kapfenberger SV.

Coaching career
After retiring, Bea worked as assistant manager at Levante UD and SD Eibar under José Luis Mendilibar, his former coach at Valladolid. On 24 February 2022, he was appointed head coach of the Dominican Republic national side. 

Bea signed with CD Numancia in the same capacity in November 2022.

References

External links

1978 births
Living people
Sportspeople from Álava
Spanish footballers
Footballers from the Basque Country (autonomous community)
Association football defenders
La Liga players
Segunda División players
Segunda División B players
Tercera División players
SD Amorebieta footballers
Amurrio Club footballers
Ciudad de Murcia footballers
Lorca Deportiva CF footballers
Real Valladolid players
Real Murcia players
Austrian Football Bundesliga players
FC Wacker Innsbruck (2002) players
Spanish expatriate footballers
Expatriate footballers in Austria
Spanish expatriate sportspeople in Austria
Spanish football managers
Primera Federación managers
CD Numancia managers
Dominican Republic national football team managers
Spanish expatriate football managers
Expatriate football managers in the Dominican Republic
Spanish expatriate sportspeople in the Dominican Republic
Spanish trade union leaders